= Dongguan Middle School-SSL School =

Coordinates: 22.9055551°N 113.8771627°E

Location
- No.1 Hongmian Road, Songshan Lake Hi-tech Development Zone, Dongguan, Guangdong

Information
- Type: Attach to the Bureau of Education of Dongguan; One-Level Middle School of Guangdong
- Motto: 为学以真，立身以诚 (Study Genuinely, Develop Nobly)
- Established: 2005
- Principal: Dewen Li
- Faculty: 317
- Enrollment: 3880
- Website: http://www.sslgz.net/

Dongguan Middle School-SSL School (Chinese: 东莞中学松山湖学校) is a public middle school located in Dongguan, Guangdong, China. It was founded in 2005 and is attached to the Bureau of Education of Dongguan. The school has two main campuses: a junior high school campus that provides classes from grade 7–9; and a senior high school campus that covers grade 10–12.

The school holds diverse festivals every 2 years, including sports, technology, fine arts and reading.
